Peacock Mountain is a summit in Okanogan County, Washington, in the United States.

Peacock Mountain took its name from nearby Peacock Mine.

References

Mountains of Okanogan County, Washington
Mountains of Washington (state)